Marjorie Sue Zatz (born December 19, 1955) is an American sociologist and professor of sociology at the University of California, Merced, where she is also the Vice Provost and Graduate Dean.

Education and career
Zatz received her B.A. from the University of Massachusetts, Amherst in 1977, where she majored in sociology and minored in Latin American studies. She went on to receive her M.A. and Ph.D. in sociology from Indiana University, Bloomington in 1979 and 1982, respectively. Her Ph.D. minor was Latin American studies. She joined the faculty of Arizona State University in 1982 as an assistant professor. On July 16, 2012, she began working at the National Science Foundation as the director of their  Law and Social Sciences program. In 2014, she left the National Science Foundation and Arizona State University to join the faculty of the University of California, Merced.

References

External links
 Faculty page
 

1955 births
Living people
American women social scientists
Arizona State University faculty
American criminologists
University of California, Merced faculty
University of Massachusetts Amherst College of Social and Behavioral Sciences alumni
Indiana University alumni
American women criminologists
American women academics
21st-century American women